Königsborn is a village and a former municipality in the Jerichower Land district, in Saxony-Anhalt, Germany. Since 1 January 2010, it is part of the municipality Biederitz.

It is a spa near Magdeburg, Germany, immediately to the North of the town of Gerwisch, of which it practically forms a suburb.

References
 

Former municipalities in Saxony-Anhalt
Jerichower Land